Frank Smith (born 30 April 1936) is an English former professional footballer who played in the Football League, as a goalkeeper.

Smith was a reserve goalkeeper with Queens Park Rangers when Wimbledon signed him in 1965.

References

1936 births
Living people
Sportspeople from Colchester
English footballers
Association football goalkeepers
Tottenham Hotspur F.C. players
Corinthian-Casuals F.C. players
Queens Park Rangers F.C. players
Wimbledon F.C. players
English Football League players